
Mońki County is a unit of territorial administration and local government (powiat) in Podlaskie Voivodeship, northeastern Poland. It came into being on January 1, 1999, as a result of the Polish local government reforms passed in 1998.

As of 2019 its total population is 40,518, out of which the population of Mońki is 9,986, that of Knyszyn is 2,748, that of Goniądz is 1,814, and the rural population is 25,970.

Mońki County existed also between 1954 - 1975, but it was deleted after reform.

Neighbouring counties
Mońki County is bordered by Augustów County to the north, Sokółka County to the east, Białystok County to the south, Łomża County to the west and Grajewo County to the north-west.

Administrative division
The county is subdivided into seven gminas (three urban-rural and four rural). These are listed in the following table, in descending order of population.

References

 
Land counties of Podlaskie Voivodeship